Oberea clara is a species of longhorn beetle in the tribe Saperdini in the genus Oberea, discovered by Pascoe in 1866.

References

C
Beetles described in 1866